Sons of Daughters is a Canadian country music duo, composed of Chrystal Leigh and Jimmy Thow. They were featured on season one of CTV's The Launch.  Their first widely released single "Ain’t Gonna Be Lonely Long" charted in the top 15 of the Canadian country radio play charts for four consecutive weeks in 2019.  They were nominated for the Rising Star Award of the Canadian Country Music Association (CCMA) in 2019 and 2020.

Discography

Extended plays

Singles

Music videos

Awards and nominations

References

Canadian country music groups
Country music duos
Musical groups from Vancouver
Musical groups established in 2013
Open Road Recordings artists
2013 establishments in British Columbia